Euxestidae is a family of beetles in the superfamily Coccinelloidea, formerly included within the family Cerylonidae. They are around 70 extant species in 10 genera, distributed primarily in the tropical and subtropical regions of Afro-Eurasia. They are found in decomposing wood, leaf litter, ant nests, and the fungus gardens of termites. All species are presumed to be mycophagous.

Selected Genera
 Euxestoxenus Arrow, 1925
 Euxestus Wollaston, 1858
 Hypodacne LeConte, 1875
 Hypodacnella Slipinski, 1988
 Metacerylon Grouvelle, 1906
 Protoxestus Sen Gupta & Crowson, 1973

References

Further reading

 
 
 
 
 
 
 
 
 
 
 

Coccinelloidea
Polyphaga families